Kelly E. Magsamen is an American foreign policy and national security advisor serving as the chief of staff to the United States Secretary of Defense in the Biden administration. She was previously the vice president for national security and international policy at the Center for American Progress.

Education 
She earned a Bachelor of Arts degree from American University and a Master of Arts from Johns Hopkins University.

Career 
Magsamen began her career at the United States Department of State, specializing in Iraq policy. She later served as the principal deputy assistant secretary of defense for Asian and Pacific Security Affairs, where she managed strategy related to Asia and the South China Sea. During the Obama administration, Magsamen worked as a staffer on the United States National Security Council.

Magsamen has appeared as a commentator NPR. She has written op-ed columns on national security issues for Defense One, Foreign Policy, The Washington Post, The Hill, and others.

References

External links

Living people
United States Department of Defense officials
Obama administration personnel
Biden administration personnel
American University alumni
Johns Hopkins University alumni
Year of birth missing (living people)